The South Western Oklahoma Development Authority (SWODA) is a voluntary association of municipalities, counties and conservation districts in Southwestern Oklahoma.

Based in Burns Flat, the South Western Oklahoma Development Authority is a member of the Oklahoma Association of Regional Councils (OARC).

Counties served

Largest cities in the region

Demographics
As of the census of 2000, there were 108,895 people, 41,801 households, and 28,759 families residing within the region. The racial makeup of the region was 82.48% White, 5.07% African American, 3.57% Native American, 0.67% Asian, 0.07% Pacific Islander, 5.39% from other races, and 2.76% from two or more races. Hispanic or Latino of any race were 9.53% of the population.

The median income for a household in the region was $27,564, and the median income for a family was $34,471. The per capita income for the region was $14,953.

References

External links
 South Western Oklahoma Development Authority - Official site.

Oklahoma Association of Regional Councils